Haphazard may refer to:

Haphazard (Owensboro, Kentucky), historic house
Haphazard, play by James A. Herne 1879 
Haphazard: a tale of Youth, novel by William Francis Casey 1917
 Haphazard (album), S. J. Tucker album released in 2004 
 Sir Abraham Haphazard, a fictional character in the novel The Warden by Anthony Trollope, published in 1855